Farit Ismeth Emir (26 October 1954 – 20 April 2020) was a Malaysian news anchor, best known as a news anchor on Radio Television Malaysia (RTM) in Bes Dunia (now Berita Dunia) (World News) segment involving foreign affairs news. He once contributed his voice in Dunhill's cigarette advertisement where his phrase, "Gaya, mutu, keunggulan" (Style, quality, excellence) was very popular during the time. He was married with Nor Ashikin Othman and had 4 children. His notable son, Farzwa De-Attaher Emir or DJ Fuzz, was a DJ, musician and composer.

He previously played a doctoral role in RTM's popular radio drama, Nombor 5 Persiaran 1 (Number 5 Tour 1). His best known catchline was "fikir-fikirkan" (think about it). Emir died on 20 April 2020 at Assunta Hospital in Petaling Jaya at the age of 65. His cause of death is said to be cancer. His remains were laid to rest at the Taman Medan (PJS4) Muslim Cemetery, Petaling Jaya after Zuhr prayers.

References

1954 births
2020 deaths
Malaysian people of Malay descent
Malaysian Muslims
People from Perak
Malaysian television news anchors